Boško Minić (born 24 October 1966) is a former Serbian footballer who played as a striker.

Club career
He played for Jeonnam Dragons of the South Korean K League.

References

External links
 

1966 births
Living people
Sportspeople from Pančevo
Yugoslav footballers
Serbian footballers
Serbian expatriate footballers
Association football forwards
GNK Dinamo Zagreb players
Jeonnam Dragons players
K League 1 players
Expatriate footballers in France
Serbian expatriate sportspeople in France
Expatriate footballers in Greece
Serbian expatriate sportspeople in Greece
Expatriate footballers in South Korea
Serbian expatriate sportspeople in South Korea